Giebisch is a surname. Notable people with the surname include:

 Gerhard Giebisch (1927–2020), American physiologist
 Leopold Giebisch (1901–1945), Austrian footballer
 Susi Giebisch (born 1930), Austrian pair skater